Fabio Roscioli (born 18 July 1965 in Grottammare) is an Italian former professional road bicycle racer. In 1993, he won the 12th stage of the Tour de France.

Major results

1986
 1st Gran Premio San Giuseppe
1988
 4th Milan–San Remo
1990
 2nd E3 Prijs Vlaanderen
1992
 1st Overall (TTT) Cronostaffetta
1993
 1st Stage 12 Tour de France
 2nd Coppa Bernocchi
 3rd Gran Premio Città di Camaiore
 4th Coppa Ugo Agostoni
 6th Tre Valli Varesine
 8th Overall Herald Sun Tour
1994
 1st  Overall Three Days of De Panne
 1st Stage 9 Tour de Suisse
 3rd Gran Premio Città di Rio Saliceto e Correggio
 4th Overall Settimana Internazionale di Coppi e Bartali
1st Stage 4
 9th Gent–Wevelgem
 9th Trofeo Pantalica
1995
 6th Nokere Koerse
 9th Overall Ronde van Nederland
1996
 1st Milano–Vignola
 1st GP d'Europe
 2nd Firenze–Pistoia
 4th Giro del Piemonte
 5th Coppa Sabatini
 6th Trofeo Melinda
 7th Japan Cup
 8th Brabantse Pijl
 9th Giro di Romagna
 10th Dwars door België
1997
 1st  Overall Hofbrau Cup
1999
 1st Stage 14 Vuelta a España
 1st Stage 6 Vuelta a Asturias

References

External links 

Official Tour de France results for Fabio Roscioli

Italian male cyclists
1965 births
Living people
Italian Tour de France stage winners
Sportspeople from the Province of Ascoli Piceno
Tour de Suisse stage winners
Cyclists from Marche